SYR8: Andre Sider af Sonic Youth is a live album by Sonic Youth with Mats Gustafsson and Merzbow. It was the eighth release in the SYR series. It was released on July 28, 2008. The album was recorded on July 1, 2005 at the Roskilde Festival. The album title is in Danish and means "Other sides of Sonic Youth".

Track listing

Notes
Recorded live at Roskilde Festival, July 1, 2005
Mixed at Studio Concord, 2006
Mastered at Golden Mastering

Personnel
Credits were adapted from the album's liner notes.

Sonic Youth
Kim Gordon – guitar, vocals
Thurston Moore – guitar
Jim O'Rourke – bass 
Lee Ranaldo – guitar
Steve Shelley – drums, percussion

Additional musicians
Mats Gustafsson – winds
Merzbow – laptop

Technical
Barok Films – recording
Jim O'Rourke – mixing
Aaron Mullan – live sound
Jørgen Teller – translation
John Golden – mastering
Design personnel
Chris Habib – graphic design
Lee Ranaldo & Eric Barcht – photos

References 

2008 albums
Sonic Youth albums
Sonic Youth Recordings live albums
Collaborative albums